Bruno Bonfim (born 18 May 1979 in Anápolis) is a middle-distance freestyle swimmer from Brazil, who competed for his native country at the 2004 Summer Olympics in Athens, Greece. A year earlier, he won the bronze medal at the Pan American Games in Santo Domingo, Dominican Republic.

At the 2000 FINA World Swimming Championships (25 m) in Athens, Bonfim went to the 4×200-metre freestyle final, finishing in 8th place. He also finished 22nd in the 400-metre freestyle.

In the 2002 FINA World Swimming Championships (25 m) in Moscow, Bonfim was close to winning a medal, finishing in 4th place in the 4×200-metre freestyle  also got the 20th place in the 400-metre freestyle  and the 13th in the 1500-metre freestyle.

He swam at the 2002 Pan Pacific Swimming Championships, where he finished 5th in the 4×200-metre freestyle, 7th in the 1500-metre freestyle, 8th in the 400-metre freestyle, 8th in the 800-metre freestyle, and 16th in the 200-metre freestyle.

Participating in the 2003 World Aquatics Championships in Barcelona, Bonfim finished 30th in the 400-metre freestyle  and 24th in the 1500-metre freestyle.

In 2003, he won the bronze medal at the 2003 Pan American Games in 400-metre freestyle. He also finished 6th place in the 1500-metre freestyle.

He represented Brazil in Athens Olympics in 2004, swimming 4×200-metre freestyle, where he finished in 9th place, and 400-metre freestyle, where he arrived in 34th place.

References
Folha Online
UOL profile

External links 
 
 

1979 births
Living people
Olympic swimmers of Brazil
Swimmers at the 2003 Pan American Games
Swimmers at the 2004 Summer Olympics
Pan American Games bronze medalists for Brazil
Brazilian male freestyle swimmers
Pan American Games medalists in swimming
Medalists at the 2003 Pan American Games
Sportspeople from Goiás
People from Anápolis